Wayne County is a county located in east central Indiana, United States, on the border with Ohio.  As of the 2020 United States Census, the population was 66,553.  The county seat is Richmond.

Wayne County comprises the Richmond, IN Micropolitan Statistical Area.

Richmond hosts Earlham College, a small private liberal arts college.

History
The first permanent European-American settlers in the area were Quakers from North Carolina. They settled about 1806 near the east fork of the Whitewater River, an area including what is today the city of Richmond. Jeptha Turner, the first white child in the county, was born here in 1806.  

Wayne County was formed in 1811 from portions of Clark and Dearborn counties. It was named for Gen. "Mad" Anthony Wayne, who was an officer during the Revolutionary War. Wayne is mainly remembered for his service in the 1790s in the Northwest Indian War, which included many actions in Indiana and Ohio. Randolph County was formed from the northern portion of Wayne County, effective August 1818.

The first county seat was Salisbury, Indiana, a town which no longer exists. It was later moved to Centerville, Indiana in 1818, where it remained until Richmond was designated as the seat in 1873.

During the antebellum years, Wayne County had a number of stations on the Underground Railroad, a network of blacks and whites who aided refugees from slavery to reach freedom. Levi Coffin and his wife Catharine aided more than 1,000 refugees at their home in Fountain City, now designated as a National Historic Landmark and State Historic Site significant to the Ohio River National 

In the 1920s, Indiana had the strongest Ku Klux Klan organization in the country, led by Grand Dragons D. C. Stephenson and Walter F. Bossert. Its members controlled the state legislature and had an ally in Governor Ed Jackson. At its height, national membership during the second Klan movement reached 1.5 million, with 300,000 in Indiana. Records show that Wayne County was home to Whitewater Klan No. 60. Robert Lyons, of Richmond, was national chief of staff for the Klan. During this period, the Klan had the most members in cities rather than rural areas; it attracted members new to cities who were unsettled by waves of immigrants from Europe and migrants from other regions of the US.

Geography

Wayne County includes Indiana's highest natural elevation, Hoosier Hill, at 1,257 feet (383 m).

Adjacent counties

 Randolph County  (north)
 Darke County, Ohio  (northeast)
 Preble County, Ohio  (east)
 Union County  (south)
 Fayette County (southwest)
 Henry County (west)

Cities 
 Richmond

Towns

 Boston
 Cambridge City
 Centerville
 Dublin
 East Germantown
 Economy
 Fountain City
 Greens Fork
 Hagerstown
 Milton
 Richmond
 Spring Grove
 Whitewater

Unincorporated towns 

 Abington
 Beesons
 Bethel
 Chester
 College Corner
 Dalton
 East Haven
 Franklin
 Greenwood
 Hiser
 Jacksonburg
 Locust Grove
 Middleboro
 Pennville
 Pinhook
 South Richmond
 Spring Grove Heights
 Wayne
 Webster
 West Grove
 Williamsburg

Townships

 Abington
 Boston
 Center
 Clay
 Dalton
 Franklin
 Green
 Harrison
 Jackson
 Jefferson
 New Garden
 Perry
 Washington
 Wayne
 Webster

Major highways

  Interstate 70
  U.S. Route 27
  U.S. Route 35
  U.S. Route 40
  State Road 1
  State Road 38
  State Road 121
  State Road 227

Climate and weather 

Government

The county government is a constitutional body, and is granted specific powers by the Constitution of Indiana, and by the Indiana Code.

County Council: The county council is the legislative branch of the county government and controls all the spending and revenue collection in the county. Representatives are elected from county districts. The council members serve four-year terms. They are responsible for setting salaries, the annual budget, and special spending. The council also has limited authority to impose local taxes, in the form of an income and property tax that is subject to state level approval, excise taxes, and service taxes.

Board of Commissioners: The executive body of the county is made of a board of commissioners. The commissioners are elected at-large, county-wide, in staggered terms, and each serves a four-year term. One of the commissioners, typically the most senior, serves as president. The commissioners are charged with executing the acts legislated by the council, collecting revenue, and managing the day-to-day functions of the county government.

Court: The county maintains a small claims court that can handle some civil cases. The judge on the court is elected to a term of four years and must be a member of the Indiana Bar Association. The judge is assisted by a constable who is also elected to a four-year term. In some cases, court decisions can be appealed to the state level circuit court.

County Officials: The county has several other elected offices, including sheriff, coroner, auditor, treasurer, recorder, surveyor, and circuit court clerk. Each of these elected officers serves a term of four years and oversees a different part of county government. Members elected to county government positions are required to declare party affiliations and to be residents of the county.

Politics
Wayne County is very Republican, even by the standards of traditionally Republican Indiana. It has not supported a Democrat for president since 1936. As a measure of how Republican the county has been, it voted for Barry Goldwater during Lyndon Johnson’s 44-state landslide of 1964–albeit by 73 votes. Since then, the Democrats have only come reasonably close to winning the county three times. Bill Clinton held the GOP to pluralities during both of his bids, and Barack Obama came within three percent of carrying the county in 2008.

Demographics

As of the 2010 United States Census, there were 68,917 people, 27,551 households, and 18,126 families residing in the county. The racial makeup of the county was 90.2% white, 5.0% black or African American, 0.8% Asian, 0.2% American Indian, 0.1% Pacific islander, 1.1% from other races, and 2.7% from two or more races. Those of Hispanic or Latino origin made up 2.6% of the population. In terms of ancestry, 24.4% were German, 11.8% were Irish, 11.0% were English, and 10.9% were American.

Of the 27,551 households, 30.5% had children under the age of 18 living with them, 47.4% were married couples living together, 13.3% had a female householder with no husband present, 34.2% were non-families, and 28.5% of all households were made up of individuals. The average household size was 2.41 and the average family size was 2.93. The median age was 40.2 years.

The median income for a household in the county was $47,697 and the median income for a family was $51,155. Males had a median income of $40,644 versus $30,194 for females. The per capita income for the county was $21,789. About 12.6% of families and 16.1% of the population were below the poverty line, including 24.9% of those under age 18 and 9.3% of those age 65 or over.

Notable people
 Oliver P. Morton, 14th Governor of Indiana, born in Wayne County
 Walter R. Stubbs, 18th Governor of Kansas
 Ralph Teetor, inventor
 Levi Coffin, abolitionist, lived in Wayne Co, Indiana. He and his wife Catharine were active in the Underground Railroad, aiding refugees from slavery to reach Canada.
 Jim Jones, cult leader, attended school in Wayne County
 Timothy S. Jordan, Wisconsin politician, born in Wayne County
 Marcus Mote, early Indiana artist
 John Stark, California pioneer who rescued members of the Donner Party

School Corporations
 Richmond Community Schools, Richmond
 Western Wayne Schools, Cambridge City
 Northeastern Wayne Schools, Fountain City
 Nettle Creek Schools, Hagerstown
 Centerville-Abington Community Schools, Centerville

See also
 National Register of Historic Places listings in Wayne County, Indiana

References

External links
 Wayne County, Indiana
 WayNet.org
 GoWayneCounty

 
Indiana counties
1811 establishments in Indiana Territory
Populated places established in 1811